From 1906 to 1926, the Finnish Swimming Federation did not arrange a dedicated national competition, but spread out the hosting duties of the championship events to multiple clubs.

Diving

Men

Plain 
Competed in Helsinki on 21 July 1912.

Source:

Platform 
Competed in Turku on 11 August 1912.

Source:

Springboard 
Competed in Helsinki on 21 July 1912.

Source:

Women

Platform 
Competed in Turku on 11 August 1912.

Source:

Swimming

Men

100 metre freestyle 
Competed in Helsinki on 20 July 1912.

Source:

500 metre freestyle 
Competed in Vaasa on 27 July 1912.

Source:

1000 metre freestyle 
Competed in Helsinki on 21 July 1912.

Source:

100 metre backstroke 
Competed in Helsinki on 19 July 1912.

Source:

100 metre breaststroke 
Competed in Vaasa on 27 July 1912.

Source:

200 metre breaststroke 
Competed in Helsinki on 20 July 1912.

Source: 

Aaltonen's result broke the world record. It could not be ratified, because the track was inspected to be two centimetres too short.

400 metre breaststroke 
Competed in Vaasa on 28 July 1912.

Source:

100 metre life saving 
Competed in Vaasa on 28 July 1912.

Source:

4 × 50 metre freestyle relay 
Competed in Turku on 10 August 1912.

Source:

Women

50 metre freestyle 
Competed in Turku on 11 August 1912.

Source:

100 metre freestyle 
Competed in Vaasa on 28 July 1912.

Source:

Water polo

Men 
Competed in Helsinki on 20 July 1912.

The championship was settled by one match, won by Helsingfors Simsällskap 6–0 (2–0, 4–0).

Sources

References 

National swimming competitions
National championships in Finland
Swimming competitions in Finland
1912 in Finnish sport
1912 in water sports
Diving competitions in Finland
Water polo competitions